The Sidmouth Harbour Railway was a short-lived attempt in the 1830s to create a harbour in the bay at Sidmouth, Devon on the south coast of England.  To enable its construction a railway was built along the seafront and then via a tunnel in the cliff east of the town towards natural deposits at Hook Ebb. Only a few traces of the railway and tunnel remain today.

In the early years of the nineteenth century Sidmouth had been a popular seaside resort, but its popularity was declining; at the same time the small, exposed harbour was shoaling badly, and local promoters considered building a properly protected harbour, by the construction of two stone piers at the Chit Rocks, at the western end of Sidmouth sea front. Plentiful supplies of suitable stone were available at Hook Ebb, a location on the coast  to the east beneath Salcombe Hill.

An Act of Parliament for the work was obtained in 1836, and the railway was duly laid. Foundation stones for each of the two piers were formally laid amid considerable ceremony, befitting the intended dedication of the piers to, respectively, Her Imperial Highness The Grand Duchess Helena of Russia, and Princess Victoria (later to become Queen Victoria).

The railway ran parallel to the sea front, and along the esplanade at Sidmouth itself.

In the shingle the railway was fixed in place by vertical timber piles.

A local blacksmith constructed a machine to pull the wagons loaded with the stone; the machine relied on human muscle power and was found to be inadequate. Apparently a locomotive was now ordered, and brought by coastal ship to the shore at Sidmouth; however there was no craneage available to unload it, so the ship was taken to Exmouth, where the locomotive was unloaded and brought to Sidmouth by horse and cart.

On placing the locomotive on the track at Sidmouth, it was discovered that it was too large to pass through the tunnel, and the scheme to use it was abandoned. Afterwards, it seems to have been used to give novelty pleasure rides for a period.

By 1838 the locomotive was removed, as was also the viaduct at Sidmouth. By this time £12,000 of the £15,000 projected cost of building the harbour had been expended, and nothing further was done, the subscribers having nothing to show for their investment. The tunnel remains in place, and during 1966-1967 storm action exposed a considerable length of the piles of the railway.

Notes

References

External links
 The Sidmouth Harbour Company of 1836

Closed railway lines in South West England
Rail transport in Devon
Sidmouth